Eugenia abbreviata is a species of plant in the family Myrtaceae. It is endemic to Jamaica.

References

abbreviata
Endangered plants
Endemic flora of Jamaica
Taxonomy articles created by Polbot